Hôtel de Pékin – Dreams for a Dragon Queen is a 2008 English language opera by the Dutch composer Willem Jeths to a libretto by Friso Haverkamp. The opera was commissioned for opening of the opera theatre in the :nl:Wilminktheater en Muziekcentrum Enschede, part of the new :nl:Nationaal Muziekkwartier in Enschede on 22 November 2008.

The opera is based on the deathbed reminiscences of the empress Cixi.

Recording
 Hôtel de Pékin - Monique Krüs, Dennis Wilgenhof, Mark Stone, Angela Kerrison, Iestyn Morris, Robert Burt, Mijke Sekhuis, Karin Strobos, Netherlands Radio Choir, Netherlands Radio Chamber Philharmonic, conducted by Michael Schonwandt. Etcetera (label) 2012

References

2008 operas
Operas
English-language operas